Leiv Heggstad (24 March 1879  8 March 1954) was a Norwegian educator, linguist and translator. He was born in Namsos as the son of linguist and professor Marius Hægstad and Pernele Larsdotter Midgaard, and was a brother of engineering professor Olav Heggstad. Among his works are Utsyn yver gamall norsk folkevisedikting from 1912, Gamalnorsk ordbok from 1930, and Norsk grammatikk from 1931. He also translated books from Latin into Nynorsk language.

References

1879 births
1954 deaths
People from Namsos
Heads of schools in Norway
Norwegian textbook writers
Norwegian translators